The Midland Railway Class 3 4-4-0 was a series of 80 steam engines built by the Midland railway at the Derby locomotive works between 1900 and 1905.
They were designed for express passenger trains, earlier types not being powerful enough for the new heavier trains. They were the first of that railway's engines to be built new with Belpaire fireboxes, and the engines were generally known as "Belpaires".

Overview
There were only minor differences between the four groups. All had 6 ft 9 in driving wheels with inside cylinders of 19½ in diameter with 26 in stroke. Seventy-three received type G8AS superheated boilers between 1913 and 1926. The remaining 7 continued in service with  non-superheated boilers.

Disposal
The 7 non-superheated locomotives were withdrawn in 1925/6. No. 714, was destroyed in the Charfield railway disaster of October 1928 and the remainder withdrawn between 1935 and 1953. None has been preserved.

Numbering

References

Sources
 Bob Essery and David Jenkinson An Illustrated Review of Midland Locomotives from 1883 (Didcot, Oxon: Wild Swan Publications)
Vol. 2 – Passenger tender classes (1988) 
 Stephen Summerson Midland Railway Locomotives – Irwell Press
Vol. 4 – Johnson classes part 2 : the goods and later passenger tender engines, Deeley, Fowler and LTSR classes. 

Midland Railway locomotives
Standard gauge steam locomotives of Great Britain
4-4-0 locomotives
Railway locomotives introduced in 1900
2′B n2 locomotives
Scrapped locomotives